Ansett Australia Flight 232, on Wednesday, 15 November 1972, was a flight from Adelaide, South Australia aboard a Fokker Friendship bound for Alice Springs, Northern Territory. It was Australia's second aircraft hijacking (after the first in 1960), and resulted in the perpetrator's death by suicide.

In-flight hijack attempt
A male passenger, subsequently identified as Miloslav Hrabinec, a Czech migrant, had boarded the flight in Adelaide with a concealed sawn-off .22 ArmaLite rifle and a sheath knife strapped to his leg. About a half-hour before the scheduled landing time, as the flight was making its descent into Alice Springs Airport, he emerged from the lavatory, produced the gun and said to a flight attendant named Gai Rennie "This is a hijack". 

Gai walked through cabin followed by hijacker. She then explained to flight attendant Kaye Goreham that the man behind her had  a gun. All three then moved to front of aircraft. Gai then advised Captain Young & first officer Walter Gowans that there was a man wanting to talk & he had a gun & said it was a hijack. However Captain said he was in landing mode & would talk to him on the ground. Captain asked Gai 'what does he want'. Gai replied that she didn't know.  Hrabinec was informed by crew that he needed to be seated for landing and he complied.

Negotiations with police
After the plane landed police commenced negotiations with the hijacker. According to Goreham's account, Hrabinec stated his motive was not financial (he asked for no money) but that he wanted to commit suicide in a spectacular way by parachuting into a remote location and surviving for as long as he could before killing himself. To this end he demanded a light aircraft, a parachute and a jumpsuit.

Attempt to escape in a light aircraft
A civilian pilot and flying instructor, the local Aero Club manager Ossie Watts, volunteered himself and his Cessna aircraft. An undercover police constable Paul Sandeman, posing as Watts' navigator, was also on board the Cessna. According to Kaye Goreham, Hrabinec became suspicious upon seeing Sandeman and requested Goreham search Sandeman for weapons. Goreham did so but did not inform the hijacker when she felt a small firearm Sandeman had hidden. Goreham states that the policeman "went for his gun" and the hijacker shot Sandeman in the hand and stomach. Sandeman was also shot in the right shoulder and left arm. The hijacker ran off and Watts, who had been shown how to use a gun minutes earlier, began shooting. Police marksmen also opened fire and Hrabinec was wounded. Hrabinec then retreated to a ditch where he fatally shot himself.

Outcome
Constable Sandeman was awarded the Queen's Commendation for Bravery.

Hrabinec was not identified as the hijacker until May 1973.

See also
 Trans Australia Airlines Flight 408 Attempted hijacking of a Lockheed Electra in 1960
 Qantas Flight 1737 Attempted hijacking of a Boeing 717 in 2003

Notes

References

. Retrieved on 2006-09-16.

Ansett Australia accidents and incidents
Aircraft hijackings in Australia
Aviation accidents and incidents in the Northern Territory
Aviation accidents and incidents in 1972
1972 crimes in Australia
Accidents and incidents involving the Fokker F27
Terrorist incidents in Oceania in 1972
1970s in the Northern Territory
November 1972 events in Australia
1972 deaths
Terrorist incidents in Australia in the 1970s